This is a list of Kiosk software. The list includes kiosk-exclusive software as well as Mobile Device Management software with kiosk features.

General information

References 

Kiosks
Mobile device management
Windows security software
Kiosk